The 43rd Golden Bell Awards (Mandarin:第43屆金鐘獎) was held on October 31, 2008 at Sun Yat-sen Memorial Hall in Taipei, Taiwan. The ceremony was broadcast live by Azio TV.

Winners and nominees
Below is the list of winners and nominees for the main categories.

References

2008
2008 television awards
2008 in Taiwan